Madiga, also known as Maadiga, Maatangi, Makkalu and Mahadiga, are an artisan community from southern India. They mainly live in the states of Andhra Pradesh, Telangana and Karnataka, with a small minority in Tamil Nadu.

Madigas are historically associated with the work of tannery, leatherwork and small handicrafts. Today, most are agricultural labourers. They are categorised as a Scheduled Caste by the Government of India.

History
Colonial writers such as Edgar Thurston and Siraj-ul-Hasan speculated Madiga derived from Mahadige or maha dige ra ("great man come down"). This is related to the common origin story that the Madigas originated from Jambavanta, who helped the gods out of a difficulty. Other stories claimed the Madiga caste was cursed to skin dead cattle because one of their ancestors slaughtered and ate the divine cow.madigas in vijayanagara empire were village headmen .the reddy community which is present dominant community in andhra pradesh were also once village headmen like madigas in vijayanagara empire. 

Madigas have their own classes, the priestly class is known as Madiga Dasari. The Sangaris, Thothis, etc. have different works for their community. They are also village drummers who use Dandora or Dappu in festivals, death and marriage ceremony and announcements.

In Old Mysore, the Madigas were one of the main Dalit communities, along with the Holeyas. The first social reform movements for their 'upliftment' were paternalistic upper caste-led movements that sought to make Madigas more like upper castes in customs and traditions. This included making them give up alcohol and traditions such as the buffalo sacrifice. Although initially the Madigas took to the movements with great fervour, they soon abandoned them when they realized the upper castes were still treating them with the same contempt as before. Thus they turned to secular modes of upliftment such as education and change of occupation, which was further opened to them by the reservation system.

Politics 
Early politics related to Dalits, including Madigas, in Andhra Pradesh was centered around welfare schemes for them, a form of politics most typical of Congress. With the rise of the TDP, social polarization took on a political hue: with Dalits being considered "rebellious" if they did not support the TDP . In Telangana, Dalits and other backward communities formed the main base of the Left parties, who helped bring an end to the vetti system and other injustices committed by the landlords. However, in areas where the Left was not strong, the Dalits followed patronage systems and supported the Congress of their Reddy landlords.

Initially, during the 1991 Lok Sabha elections, the DMS was unable to turn the Dalit anger after Tsundur into setting the political discourse. However, after the Bahujan Samaj Party-Samajwadi Party alliance came to power in the 1993 Uttar Pradesh assembly elections, the DMS thought they could create a similar victory in Andhra Pradesh. With the political aspirations of the Dalits and some other backward classes (like the Gollas) awakened, Kanshi Ram's tour of Andhra Pradesh in 1994 was fairly popular and awakened leaders not just from the Malas, Madigas other Dalits castes but from marginalized BC leaders too. However, the media attention on the BSP in Andhra Pradesh also led to vernacular media, who the Dalits saw as biased, focusing on internal issues of the BSP. In addition, the sudden subaltern assertion forced Congress and TDP to completely reorient their electoral strategy, with Congress attempting to capture the BSP's votebank and the TDP creating populist schemes. The countermeasures promised by the TDP led to their massive victory in the 1994 assembly elections, and to the BSP's almost total defeat. It was felt the movement of the Mahasabha into electoral politics away from their initial goal of social transformation was highly detrimental to the anti-caste movement in Andhra Pradesh as a whole and resulted in the dissolution of grassroots activists with their leaders.

Madiga Dandora movement 
The Madigas and Malas, who lived in different hamlets (palem), remained separate even after conversion to Protestant Christianity in Coastal Andhra. The Madigas in Coastal Andhra, starting in the 1850s, had mainly converted to Baptism while the Malas were Lutherans. Landlords furthered this division, perhaps intentionally, by giving preferential treatment in certain domains to either Malas or Madigas. The continued division between these two sub-castes and the collapse of the Dalit movement allowed for the promotion of specific caste causes. One criticism some made of the Dalit Mahasabha was that its leaders came mostly from coastal Andhra, which was Mala-dominated. In 1994, Manda Krishna Madiga and Dandu Veeraiah Madiga formed the Madiga Reservation Porata Samiti to demand the categorisation of the SC reservation quota to ensure equitable distribution of state allocations for all the constituent castes. This movement, more popularly known as the Madiga Dandora movement, held dharnas, mass rallies, rail rokos, and other activities to publicize their claims that a few among the SCs had secured all the benefits for themselves. Their agitations led to a commission headed by justice Ramachandra Raju to examine the issue. In 1997, the commission published its report which found that reservation benefits had mainly gone to the Mala and Adi Andhra communities, and neither the Madiga or Relli had proportional representation in the quota. The commission recommended a four-fold classification of SCs for reservation benefit: 1% for group D (Rellis and related), 7% for group C (Madigas and related), 6% for group B (Malas and related) and 1% for Adi Andhra.

Distribution and occupation 
Madigas live mainly in Andhra Pradesh, Telangana, and Karnataka, with small minorities in neighbouring states. Around 3.4 million live in Andhra Pradesh, spread throughout the state except for the 3 districts of Uttarandhra, and another 3.2 million lives throughout Telangana. Another 1 million or so lived in Karnataka, mainly in eastern districts of Karnataka. However, it has generally been observed that the Malas were more dominant in coastal Andhra and the Madigas were more dominant in interior regions such as Telangana.

Some Madigas were forced to perform village services such as horn-blowing, drum-beating, leatherwork and menial service, in return for which they received inam land. Those who performed menial service, or etti, were known as etti-Madiga. This subdivision was required to clean the streets, carry government officials' luggage, assisting in collection of revenue, and generally maintaining peace and order as watchmen. They claimed all dead animals of the village, and were required to dispose of dead cattle, considered the most polluting occupation. The Madiga skinned the hides and tanned them to make leather articles, such as belts, pouches, toddy-containers, and bags. To each caste the Madiga were obligated to provide those leather objects necessary to that caste's occupation. The Etti-Madiga also were obligated to serve their landlord family by performing menial tasks in the house and on the farm. The Madiga were also once obligated under the vetti system to provide free labour to landlords for a certain number of days during peak periods of agricultural labour. When payment was made, it was less than to peasant communities such as Kapus.

After the 1960s, several changes occurred to greatly transform Madiga livelihood. Firstly, the introduction of the Green Revolution favoured capital-intensive production and the mechanization of agriculture, which created an economic scenario where much fewer people were needed to work the land. This further eroded the small amount of mutual dependence agricultural landlords had previously had on peasants such as the Madigas, making them even more vulnerable to exploitation. In addition, it was at this time that industrially-produced goods began to enter and eventually dominate rural markets. The small operations of the Madiga leather artisans could not compete with industrial outfits mass-producing items such as chappals, which themselves were replaced by cheap rubber slippers. This pushed them to agriculture as their only livelihood, increasing their dependence on the landlords. This was continued with some practices such as the 1/3 system in coastal Andhra, where landlords allotted an acre or two to Dalits (mainly Madigas as they were seen as more submissive) and provided starting goods such as seeds and fertilizer. In return the tenant was an agricultural labourer on the landlord's fields for a usually nominal wage. After harvest, the landlord received 2/3 of the crop and the tenant 1/3, which helped the landlord to tie the tenant to them and maintain economic dependence. Thus the Green Revolution was marked by an increase in prosperity for the Kammas, while the landless Madiga and Mala labourers continued to face severe exploitation and oppression. Only in urban areas could the Madigas feasibly continue their traditional occupation as daily wage labourers in leather processing factories, which marginalized them further in the modern economy.

Culture 
Although most Madigas follow folk traditions of their villages in Rayalaseema and Telangana, the vast majority in Coastal Andhra follow Protestant Christianity. Although conversion to Christianity was widespread among Dalits in coastal Andhra, the Madigas and Malas converted to the Baptist and Lutheran churches respectively, preserving their caste identity. However these Christian converts identify as Hindu to ensure they still obtain Scheduled Caste reservation, which is given only to those who are Hindu, Buddhist or Sikh as per a 1950 presidential order.

In popular culture
The activists Lelle Suresh and Sabrina Francis made a documentary on the condition and culture of the community, titled Mahadiga, which was released in 2004.

Notable people
Bangaru Laxman, first Dalit national president of BJP, former M.P and Union minister
A. Narayanaswamy, M.P of Chitradurga 
N Rachaiah Ex Minister Karnataka

K H Muniyappa Ex MP, Former Central Minister of Karnataka Kolar Lok Sabha constituency

Roopa shashidhar, MLA of Kolar Gold 
 Field constituency Karnataka

Anjunaiah Ex Minister Karnataka

Govinda karjola Deputy chief 
 Minister Karnataka

Anekal Narayana swamy Central Minister from Karnataka

Malyala Rajaiah, Ex Finance Minister,Power Minister, Housing Minister,(Andhra Pradesh) Ex Member of Parliament of Siddipet constituency, Telangana

References

Further reading

Jumba Puranam – Caste Origin myth
Liberative Motifs in the Dalit Religion
Caste, Class and Social articulation in Andhra Pradesh

Telugu society
Scheduled Castes of Andhra Pradesh
Scheduled Castes of Karnataka